The UniSport Division 1 Handball Nationals (before: 2018 Australian University Games)  is an annual mixed gender tournament conducted by the UniSport to determine the national champion of Division 2 collegiate handball in Australia. The tournament was held first held 2009, was re-instated in 2011, and has been held every year since until 2016. It should re-instate in 2020.

Results

Medal count

See also
UniSport Division 1 Handball Nationals

References

External links
UniSport Division 1 Handball Nationals

Handball Division 2
2009 establishments in Australia
Recurring sporting events established in 2009